"The Only Living Boy in New York" is a song written by Paul Simon and performed by Simon & Garfunkel. It is the eighth track from the duo's fifth and final studio album, Bridge over Troubled Water. The song was also issued as the B-side to the duo's "Cecilia" single.

The version recorded by Everything But The Girl was used to play at the end of Season 2/Episode 3 (“Original Sin”) of the TV series Designated Survivor, starring Kiefer Sutherland.

Background 
Simon wrote this as a thinly veiled message to Art Garfunkel, referencing in the first stanza a specific incident where Garfunkel went to Mexico to act in the film Catch-22. Simon was left alone in New York writing songs for Bridge over Troubled Water, hence the very lonely feelings of "The Only Living Boy in New York." Simon refers to Garfunkel in the song as "Tom", alluding to their early days when they were called Tom and Jerry, and encourages him to "let your honesty shine . . . like it shines on me".
The background vocals feature both Garfunkel and Simon recorded together in an echo chamber, multi-tracked around eight times.

Personnel
 Paul Simon — lead vocals, background vocals, acoustic guitar
 Art Garfunkel — backup and harmony vocals
 Joe Osborn — bass guitar
 Larry Knechtel — Hammond organ
 Fred Carter Jr. — acoustic guitar
 Hal Blaine — drums, triangle

Covers
The reggae hit "Weather Report", by the Tennors, was adapted from this song.
This song was covered by the Coolies on their 1986 album dig..?, along with eight other tongue-in-cheek covers of Simon & Garfunkel classics.
In 1992, British indie band Carter the Unstoppable Sex Machine parodied the title of the song for their biggest-selling single, "The Only Living Boy In New Cross". (New Cross is an area of south-east London.)
A cover of the song was recorded by English musical duo Everything but the Girl for their greatest hits album Home Movies. It was released as a single on 12 April 1993 and spent five weeks on the UK Singles Chart, peaking at number 42.
Black 47 frontman Larry Kirwan covered the song on his 2001 solo project Kilroy Was Here.
Marc Cohn released a cover version as part of his 2010 album of tribute songs, Listening Booth: 1970.
Passenger, the Once and Stu Larsen covered the song as part of their American Tour series.
Kishi Bashi covered the song as one of two singles released July 12, 2017, exclusively on Spotify, both songs having been recorded in the company's NYC studios in early April of the same year
Buffalo Tom released a cover version on their 2018 album Quiet and Peace, after guitarist Bill Janovitz performed a live cover of the song with his daughter, Lucy.
David Mead covered the song on the soundtrack album for the television series Everwood in 2004.

Use in film
 Everything but the Girl's cover was featured in the 2002 film Tadpole
 The original recording is featured as part of the soundtrack for the 2004 film Garden State.
 Used as part of the soundtrack of the 2009 film New York, I Love You.
 Honda has used sections of this song for their television commercials of the 2011 Accord.
 The original recording is featured during the final scenes of the second-season finale of Alphas.
 The original recording is used in the credits of the film Koch
 The original recording was used in the first-season finale of BBC3's comedy Uncle.
 Used in the final scene of the HBO film version of Larry Kramer's The Normal Heart (2014).
 Used in the film with the same name: The Only Living Boy in New York (2017).

Use in other media
 David Gallaher and Steve Ellis used the song as inspiration for their 2009 "The Only Living Boy" webcomic series.
 Saturday Night Live, May 13, 2017 in comedy sketch with Melissa McCarthy as Sean Spicer and Alec Baldwin as Donald Trump.
 Designated Survivor, S2E13 "Original Sin" March 14, 2018 used in the final scene.
 This is Us, S4E16 "New York New York New York" March 10, 2020 in street scene in New York City

Charts

Weekly charts

References

Simon & Garfunkel songs
Songs about New York City
Songs written by Paul Simon
1969 songs
Song recordings produced by Roy Halee
Song recordings produced by Paul Simon
Song recordings produced by Art Garfunkel
Songs about loneliness